Four Days in July is a 1984 television film by Mike Leigh.  Set and filmed in Belfast, the film explores the Troubles by following the daily lives of two couples on either side of Northern Ireland's religious divide, both expecting their first children. The film's action unfolds over 10–13 July 1984; the two couples' children are both born on 12 July, the date of a Protestant celebration in Northern Ireland known as the Twelfth. Despite the politically charged setting, the film is uniquely uneventful, at least on the surface; Paul Clements writes that "It is hard to identify any full length work by Leigh in which less of consequence seems to happen." Broadcast only once, it was Leigh's last film for the BBC.

Cast and crew
The film stars Paula Hamilton and Charles Lawson as the Protestant couple, Lorraine and Billy, and Brid Brennan and Des McAleer as the Catholic couple, Collette and Eugene. Stephen Rea, Eileen Pollock, B.J. Hogg, and Shane Connaughton appear in secondary roles. The film's music was composed by Rachel Portman.

Reception
In 2009 The Times Kevin Maher praised the film as a "must-see movie for anyone with a compassionate interest in an 800-year-old political sore." Shane Connaughton, screenwriter of My Left Foot called it "easily the most interesting picture I've seen about Northern Ireland since the troubles started. Apart from John Arden and Margaretta D'Arcy's The Ballygomben Bequest (1972), I can't think of any play or film that has gone into it so successfully in any deep way at all."

Notes

References
Clements, Paul.  "Four Days in July (Mike Leigh)." British Television Drama in the 1980s.  Comp. George W. Brandt.  Cambridge University Press, 1993. 162–176.

External links

Films directed by Mike Leigh
Films scored by Rachel Portman
Northern Irish films
Films about The Troubles (Northern Ireland)
Films set in Belfast
Films shot in Northern Ireland
BBC television dramas
British television films
1984 television films
1984 films
1980s English-language films